Ondas is an album by New Zealand jazz pianist and composer Mike Nock recorded in 1981 and released on the ECM label.

Reception
The Allmusic review by Thom Jurek awarded the album 4½ stars calling it "a glorious recording by a crack batch of musicians. It is also a stellar example of what Manfred Eicher's label and production offer to the world".

Track listing
All compositions by Mike Nock
 "Forgotten Love" - 16:00 
 "Ondas" - 9:11 
 "Visionary" - 11:37 
 "Land of the Long White Cloud" - 7:58 
 "Doors" - 6:24
Recorded at Talent Studios in Oslo, Norway in November 1981

Personnel
Mike Nock - piano, percussion
Eddie Gómez - bass
Jon Christensen - drums

References

ECM Records albums
1982 albums
Albums produced by Manfred Eicher